Esmat Bagherpour Baboli (26 February 1925 – 1 September 2004), better known as Delkash, was an Iranian diva singer and occasional actress with a rare and unique voice.

Biography
Delkash was born in Babol, and was the daughter of a cotton trader who had nine other children. She came to Tehran to study (where she stayed until her death in 2004), but she was discovered soon and was introduced to the music masters of the time, Ruhollah Khaleghi and Abdolali Vaziri. She was named Delkash by Khaleghi.

Delkash started public singing in 1943 and was employed in Radio Iran in 1945, only five years after the establishment of the program. There, she worked with the composer Mehdi Khaledi for seven years, until 1952. The best of her songs were written by Rahim Moeini Kermanshahi, Iranian lyricist, and Ali Tajvidi, Iranian composer, from 1954 until 1969. Besides Persian, Delkash sang several songs, such as Kija and Banu, in her native Mazandarani language.

She also worked as a songwriter under the pen name of Niloofar (Persian: نیلوفر) and played in a few Iranian movies, including Sharmsaar, Maadar, Farda Roushan Ast, Afsoungar, and Dasiseh. She worked with singer and electric guitar musician Vigen Derderian Sultan of Jazz. Their duet "Delam Mikhast" can be heard on YouTube. Delkash died in September 2004, at the age of 80, in Tehran and was buried in Emamzadeh Taher, a popular graveyard for the artists located in Karaj.

References

External links
Yade Man Kon یاد من کن by Delkash.

 Photograph of the graveside of Delkash at Emamzadeh Taher Cemetery, Mehrshahr: .

1925 births
2004 deaths
People from Babol
Iranian folk singers
Iranian women singers
Caltex Records artists
Taraneh Records artists
Persian-language singers
Iranian classical singers
Burials at Emamzadeh Taher
20th-century women singers
20th-century Iranian women singers